An ice palace is a castle-like structure made of ice.  The earliest known may be Anna Ivanovna's palace (1739–1740) in St. Petersburg, Russia.

Ice Palace may also refer to:

In Russia:
 Ice Palace (Saint Petersburg), an arena in St. Petersburg
 Ice Palace (Cherepovets), an arena in Cherepovets
 Ice Palace Salavat Yulaev, an arena in Ufa
 CSKA Ice Palace, in Moscow
 Neftekhimik Ice Palace, in Nizhnekamsk
 Romazan Ice Sports Palace, in Magnitogorsk
 Vityaz Ice Palace, in Podolsk

In other countries:
 The Amalie Arena, a hockey arena in Tampa, Florida, formerly called the Ice Palace
 The Miami Coliseum, a now-demolished hockey arena in Miami, Florida that was once called the Metropolitan Ice Palace
 Eispalast, a facility in the Jungfraujoch station of the Jungfraubahn in Switzerland
 The Ice Palace at the Quebec Winter Carnival in Quebec City, Canada.
 Stonewall Arena, formerly called Ice Palace, in Stonewall, Manitoba, Canada
 in Belarus: Minsk Ice Palace and Brest Ice Palace.

In other uses:
 The Ice Palace (novel), (Is-slottet), a 1963 Norwegian novel by Tarjei Vesaas
The Ice Palace (1987 film), a 1987 Norwegian film
 Ice Palace, a 1958 novel by Edna Ferber 
 Ice Palace (film), a 1960 film based on the novel, starring Richard Burton
 "The Ice Palace (short story)", a 1920 short story by F. Scott Fitzgerald
 The Ice Palace, an American variety television series with an ice skating theme, which aired on CBS for ten weeks in 1971
 Ice Palace (1985 video game), a 1985 video game by Creative Sparks

See also
Ice castle (disambiguation)